Roy Adam McBain (born 7 November 1974 in Aberdeen) is a Scottish football player and coach who currently works at Turriff United in the Highland League as a player/assistant manager.

Career
McBain began his career with Dundee United, making a single appearance early in the 1993–94 season. Released at the end of the season, McBain moved 'across the road' to First Division First Division neighbours Dundee, where he spent two seasons with the Dens Park side. In 1996, McBain moved to Third Division side Ross County, where he won promotion at the third attempt after finishing within a point of automatic promotion in his first two years at Dingwall. The title win in the 1998–99 season, saw McBain again narrowly miss out on promotion as Ross County finished two points outside of the promotion spots.

Nevertheless, McBain moved back to the First Division with Inverness Caledonian Thistle, tasting another championship and promotion in the 2003–04 season. A first-team regular with Inverness, McBain was given a new two-year contract in April 2005, and another in late 2006. In August 2010, Roy McBain played in his testimonial match. The game was between an Inverness select side and a legends team, which included Bobby Mann and Paul Sheerin. Inverness won the game 4–1. After a loan spell at Brechin City in 2011, McBain joined Peterhead in the same year.

McBain then signed for Cove Rangers in 2012. As of April 2019, McBain was working for Cove as a first team coach.

Career statistics

Honours

Ross County
 Scottish Third Division: 1
 1998–99

Inverness Caledonian Thistle
 Scottish First Division: 1
 2003–04, 2009–10

References

External links

1974 births
Living people
Footballers from Aberdeen
Dundee United F.C. players
Dundee F.C. players
Inverness Caledonian Thistle F.C. players
Ross County F.C. players
Scottish Premier League players
Scottish Football League players
Scottish footballers
People educated at Dyce Academy
Brechin City F.C. players
Cove Rangers F.C. players
Peterhead F.C. players
Association football midfielders